Members of the New South Wales Legislative Assembly  who served in the 15th parliament of New South Wales held their seats from 1891 to 1894 They were elected at the 1891 colonial election between 17 June and 3 July 1891. The Speaker was Sir Joseph Palmer Abbott.

By-elections

Under the constitution, ministers were required to resign to recontest their seats in a by-election when appointed. These by-elections are only noted when the minister was defeated; in general, he was elected unopposed.

See also
Third Dibbs ministry
Results of the 1891 New South Wales colonial election
Candidates of the 1891 New South Wales colonial election

Notes

References

Members of New South Wales parliaments by term
19th-century Australian politicians